Dino Marcan and Antonio Šančić were the defending champions, but decided not to defend their title.

Seeds

Draw

References
 Main Draw

Morocco Tennis Tour - Kenitra - Doubles
2014 Doubles
Tennis Tour - Kenitra - Doubles